Germagny is a commune in the Saône-et-Loire department in the region of Bourgogne-Franche-Comté in eastern France.

Geography
The village is located on the Guye river valley. The main roads connect the village to Savianges and Fley to the north, Bissy-sur-Fley to the east, Genouilly to the south and Le Puley to the west.

Main sights

 The Romanesque church, where a fresco showing a teenage Christ in glory, was discovered in 1983 in the apse.
 The public footpath near the River Guye. It was named "La Pléiade", in memory of Pontus de Tyard and Guillaume des Autels, who used to live in the neighbouring villages.

See also
Communes of the Saône-et-Loire department

References

Communes of Saône-et-Loire